Heba Elsewedy (born 22 September 1973) (Arabic: هبة السويدي) is an Egyptian humanitarian who is a prominent figure in the public life of Egypt. She is the Founder of Ahl Masr Foundation, a non-governmental organization that specializes in caring physically and psychologically for burn victims. She was recognized for her many initiatives and saving thousands. Some people refer to her as "Mother Teresa" of Egypt and “Mama Heba.”

Education
El Sewedy was raised between Saudi Arabia and Egypt. She received her B.A. degree in English literature from King Abdul Aziz University of Saudi in 1994.

Career highlights
Heba started her entrepreneurship journey with the Arabian French Textiles Company. She's a major shareholder in her family business Helal Elsewedy-Energya group, which offers a diverse number of products and services in the Egyptian market including manufacturing, retail and education. Art is also a core aspect of Heba's life. As an artist, she owns a line of jewellery called 'Laila Jewellery.'

Recognition
Heba was one of the people who stood firm and consistent with her role as the Arab Spring erupted. She was very passionate about her cause to care for the injured and support families. She provided medical and psychological support and many were cared for on her own private expense. She's known for her generous giving spirit and has supported about four thousand victims and families. Her role also extended further to Libya. Her role post-Jan 25 revolution earned her the title "Madame Revolution."

References

1973 births
Egyptian human rights activists
Living people